Billy Magoulias (born 23 January 1997) is a  international rugby league footballer who plays as a  for the Newtown Jets in the NSW Cup.  

He previously played for the Cronulla-Sutherland Sharks in the NRL and the Warrington Wolves in the Super League.

Background
Magoulias was born in Sydney, Australia, and is of Greek descent.

He played his junior rugby league for Mascot Jets in the South Sydney District Junior Rugby Football League and Cronulla Caringbah JRLFC.

Playing career

2018
Magoulias spent the entirety of 2018 playing for Newtown who are Cronulla's feeder club side making 26 appearances.  Magoulias played for Newtown in the Intrust Super Premiership NSW 18–12 grand final defeat against Canterbury-Bankstown at Leichhardt Oval.

2019
Magoulias made his NRL debut in round 19 of the 2019 NRL season for Cronulla-Sutherland against the North Queensland Cowboys, coming off the bench in a 16–14 victory at Shark Park.

Magoulias played for Newtown in their 2019 Canterbury Cup NSW grand final victory over Wentworthville at the Western Sydney Stadium.  Magoulias set up the winning try for Newtown in the 88th minute after the game went into extra-time.

On 29 September 2019, Magoulias was named in the 2019 Canterbury Cup NSW team of the season.

The following week in the NRL State Championship final at ANZ Stadium, Magoulias set up the winning try with just five seconds of normal time remaining.  With Newtown trailing the match, Magoulias kicked over the top of the Burleigh Bears defence and Newtown player Jackson Ferris raced away to score under the posts.

He was also part of Greece's 2021 Rugby League World Cup qualifying campaign where they qualified for their first Rugby League World Cup.

2020
In round 2 of the 2020 NRL season, he scored his first try in the top grade as Cronulla-Sutherland lost 12–10 against Melbourne at an empty Kogarah Oval.

2021
He played 11 games for Cronulla in the 2021 NRL season which saw the club narrowly miss the finals by finishing 9th on the table.

2022
Magoulias made his club debut for Warrington in their 16-12 loss against Wakefield Trinity in the Challenge Cup.
On 14 June, Magoulias was released from his Warrington contract with immediate effect on compassionate grounds.
On 22 June, Magoulias re-joined NSW Cup side Newtown.

References

External links
Sharks profile
Greece profile
Greek profile

1997 births
Living people
Australian people of Greek descent
Greek rugby league players
Australian rugby league players
Cronulla-Sutherland Sharks players
Greece national rugby league team players
Newtown Jets NSW Cup players
Rugby league locks
Warrington Wolves players
Rugby league players from Sydney
Australian expatriate sportspeople in England
Greek expatriate sportspeople in England
Expatriate rugby league players in England